Dawn of the Beast is a 2021 American horror film written by Anna Shields and directed by Bruce Wemple. It stars Francesca Anderson, Adrián Burke, Chris Cimperman, Ariella Mastroianni, Roger Mayer and Anna Shields. The film is about graduate students searching for a bigfoot.

Synopsis
Aiming to see Bigfoot, students venture deep into an area of the Northeastern wilderness that is known for its strange creature sightings. Soon, they learn that there is a much more sinister evil lurking in the woods, the Wendigo.

Cast
 Francesca Anderson as Marie
 Adrián Burke as Chris
 Chris Cimperman as Jake
 Ariella Mastroianni as Isabella
 Roger Mayer as Cashier
 Willard Morgan as Dr. Dennis Kasdan
 Anna Shields as Lilly
 Grant Schumacher as Everett
 LeJon Woods as Oz
 J.Louris, JR as Shop Owner
 Shawn Maloy as The Sasquatch

Production 
Wemple and the crew designed Dawn of the Beast to resemble "Kind of a monster Gore Fest, classic, you know, seventies, eighties drive-in popcorn flick for everyone." Scriptwriter Anna Shields and Wemple, who helped develop the story, did not want the film to take itself too seriously and "lean into some of those cliches and some of those tropes", comparing the desired result to that of the Evil Dead films.

Release
The film was released in United States on April 6, 2021 by Uncork'd Entertainment digitally and on DVD.

Reception
Critical reception for the film was mixed, with common praise centering on the gore and effects while common criticism focused on Dawn of the Beast's pacing. Phil Wheat of Nerdly rate the film 4 out of 5, praising the film as having "decent gore and SUPERB monster effects". Rue Morgue felt that the movie had a good concept, but took too long to show any action and was "dragged down by its own bloated script". Horror Society was more favorable, writing "Overall, Dawn of the Beast will not be for everyone. In fact, I can see some of you bitching about it but if you are in the mood for something a little different then I would highly recommend this crazy ass movie. You won’t see anything like it for some time."

References

External links
 

2020s monster movies
American horror films
American monster movies
American science fiction action films
Bigfoot films
Films about cryptids
2020s English-language films
2020s American films